For the American actress, see Natalie Wood.

Natalie Wood is a former Australian rules footballer and former coach of the Geelong Football Club's VFL Women's (VFLW) team. 

On 18 March 2022, Wood was appointed as the inaugural coach of the Essendon Football Club's AFL Women's team, which will enter the competition in 2022.

Wood played 190 games for the Darebin Falcons and Melbourne University in the VFLW, and represented Western Bulldogs in AFL Women's (AFLW) exhibition matches in 2013 and 2014. After retiring as a player in 2014, Wood joined Geelong as a part-time assistant coach for the club's inaugural women's team that joined the VFLW in 2017.

Wood was appointed to a full-time coaching role with Geelong as an assistant coach for the club's first season in the national AFLW competition in 2019. As part of this role, she was also promoted to senior coach of Geelong's VFLW team. This appointment meant that Wood was the first female to attain a full-time coaching role with the club.

As well as full-time coaching, Wood is a high school teacher.

On 18 March 2022, Wood was appointed as the inaugural senior coach of the Essendon Football Club's AFL Women's team, which will enter the competition in 2022.

References 

AFL Women's coaches
Living people
Year of birth missing (living people)
Melbourne University Football Club (VFLW) players
Darebin Falcons players